State Route 86 (SR 86) is an east–west state highway in the northeastern portion of the U.S. state of Ohio.  Its western terminus is at US 20 in Painesville, and its southern terminus is at SR 534 near Windsor.

SR 86 does not have an interchange with Interstate 90 but motorists can access I-90's Exit 205 in LeRoy Township via Vrooman Road, a county road. 

A significant section of SR 86 was rerouted south of Painesville 2007–2008 in a project proposed since the early 1980s. The southern portion of this section, just north of I-90, was rerouted during the 2007 construction season, and the northern, bypassing a section with a history of slope sliding, in 2008, with the road opening in full on October 31. The SR 84/86 overlap was subsequently extended approximately a half-mile.

Prior to August 17, 2007, SR 86 overlapped with SR 534 from their intersection to US 322 in Windsor.  That overlap has since been removed, with that stretch of road becoming solely SR 534.

History

1923 – Original route established; no significant changes since its certification.
2007 - Southern end truncated at SR 534 northwest of Windsor.
2008 - Rerouted near north end, overlap with SR 84 lengthened.

Major intersections

References

086
Ohio State Route 086
Ohio State Route 086
Ohio State Route 086